The State of Tripura was one of the ancient princely states of India. According to the Rajmala (the Chronicles of Kings), Tripura was ruled continuously by as many as 184 Tripuri Kings with sovereign and independent status prior to its merger with the Indian Union in 1949, after the death of the last ruling King, Bir Bikram Kishore Debbarman. His successor, Kirit Bikram Kishore Deb Barman, was thirteen years old at the time of the merger. King Bir Bikram Kishore Debbarman had died in 1947, after which a Council of Regency was formed to run the administration under the presidency of Queen Kanchan Prava Devi, mother of Kirit Bikram Kishore Deb Barman.

Within a few months after the unnatural demise of King Bir Bikram Kishore Debbarman, Tripura faced a great crisis, with threats from internal as well as external forces such as the East Pakistan. Queen Kanchan Prava Devi, as president of the Council of Regency, came under severe pressure to opt to join the Indian Union. On the advice of the Government of India, she dissolved the Council of Regency and became the sole Regent on 12 January 1948. More than a year later, on 9 September 1949, she signed the 'Tripura Merger Agreement', and with effect from 15 October 1949 Tripura became part of Indian Union. It was thereafter administered by the Chief Commissioner as a 'C' Category State.

Text

AGREEMENT made this ninth day of September 1949, between the Governor-General of India and His Highness the Maharaja of Tripura.

WHEREAS in the best interests of the State of Tripura as well as the Dominion of India it is desirable to provide for the administration of the said State by or under the authority of the Dominion Government:—

It is hereby agreed as follows:—

Article I

The Maharaja of Tripura cedes to the Dominion Government full and exclusive authority, jurisdiction and powers for and in relation to the governance of the State and agrees to transfer the administration of the State to the Dominion Government on the fifteenth day of October 1949 (herineafter referred to as the said day).

Article II

The Maharaja shall with effect from the said day be entitled to receive from revenues of the State annually for his privy purse the sum of Rupees Three lakhs and thirty thousand only [R330,000] free of taxes. This amount is intended to cover all the expenses of the Ruler and his family, including expenses on account of his personal staff, maintenance of his residences, marriages and other ceremonies etc. and will neither be increased nor reduced for any reason whatsoever.
The said sum may be drawn by the Maharaja in four equal installments in advance at the beginning of each quarter from the State Treasury or at such other treasury as may be specified by the Government of India.

Article III

The Maharaja shall be entitled to the full ownership, use and enjoyment of all private properties (as distinct from State properties) belonging to him on the date of this agreement.

The Maharaja will furnish to the Dominion Government, before 10 October 1949, an inventory of all the immovable property, securities and cash balances held by him as such private property.

If any dispute arises as to whether any item of property is the private property of the Maharaja or State property, it shall be referred to a judicial officer qualified to be appointed a High Court judge and the decision of that officer shall be final and binding on both parties.

Article IV

The Maharaja shall be entitled to all the personal rights, privileges, immunities and dignities enjoyed by him as the Ruler of Tripura, whether within or without the State, immediately before 15 August 1947.

Article V

All the members of the Maharaja's family including Her Highness the Rajmata shall be entitled to all the personal privileges and titles enjoyed by them, whether within or without the territories of the State, immediately before the 15th day of August, 1947.

Article VI

The Dominion Government guarantees the succession, according to law and custom, to the Gaddi of the State and to the Maharaja's personal rights, privileges, dignities and titles.

Article VII

No enquiry shall be made by or under the authority of the Government of India and no proceedings shall lie in any Court of Tripura against His Highness the Maharaja or Her Highness the Maharani Regent whether in a personal capacity or otherwise in respect of anything done or omitted to be done by them under their authority during the period of Regency administration of the State.

Article VIII

 The Government of India hereby guarantees either the continuance in service of the permanent members of the public services of Tripura on conditions which will be no less advantageous than those on which they were serving before the date on which the administration of Tripura is made over to the Government of India or the payment of reasonable compensation.
 The Government of India further guarantees the continuance of pensions and leaves salaries sanctioned by the Government of His Highness the Maharaja to members of the public services of the State who have retired or proceeded on leave preparatory to retirement before the date on which the Administration of Tripura is made over to the Government of India.

Article IX

Except with the previous sanction of the Government of India no proceedings civil or criminal shall be instituted against any person in respect of any act done or purporting to be done in the execution of his duties as a servant of the State before the day on which the administration is made over to the Government of India.

In confirmation whereof Mr. Vapal Pangunni Menon, adviser to the Government of India in the Ministry of States has appended his signature on behalf and with the authority of the Governor-General of India and Her Highness Queen Kanchanprava Devi, Maharani Regent of Tripura, has appended her signature on behalf of His Highness Maharaja Kirit Bikram Kishore Manikya Deb Barma Bahadur, the minor Ruler of Tripura, his heirs and successors.

Dated New Delhi, 
The 9 September 1949.

Message by the then Minister of Home Affairs

Mention may be made here that Sardar Vallabhbhai Patel, the then Minister of Home Affairs, gave the following message on the occasion of the Merger of Tripura on 15 October 1949.

References

Sardar Patel's Correspondence, Vol. 8, pp. 530–531

External links

 Official site of present Tripura state

History of Tripura (1947–present)
1949 in India
Political integration of India
1949 documents